Saudy Rosales Beneditt (born 13 October 1985) is a Costa Rican former footballer who has played as a forward. She has been a member of the Costa Rica women's national team.

International goals
Scores and results list Costa Rica's goal tally first

References

1985 births
Living people
Women's association football forwards
Costa Rican women's footballers
Costa Rica women's international footballers
Pan American Games competitors for Costa Rica
Footballers at the 2011 Pan American Games